Philip Szanto (1935–2017) was a Chicago pathologist, associate professor at the Chicago Medical School at Rosalind Franklin University and co-author of a review book, BRS Pathology, which became a standard review text for American medical students.

Szanto's family fled Vienna from the Nazis in 1938 and settled in Chicago.  Szanto attended the University of Chicago and then went on to earn his MD at the University of Basel Medical School.  Szanto later passed away on the 26th of May, 2017, at the age of 81.

Bibliography

References

1935 births
2017 deaths
Austrian emigrants to the United States
American pathologists
University of Chicago alumni
University of Basel alumni
Rosalind Franklin University of Medicine and Science faculty